Monte Greco is a mountain in the province of L'Aquila in the Abruzzo region of Italy. It is in the southern part of the Appennino Abruzzese mountain chain. The mountain is north of the Sangro river and Parco Nazionale d'Abruzzo, Lazio e Molise.

References

Mountains of Abruzzo
Mountains of the Apennines
Two-thousanders of Italy